Island Peril is a first-person shooter video game released for DOS in 1996. It was developed by Electric Fantasies and published by Atlantean Interactive Games.

Plot
The game follows the exploits of Dick Danger as he pursues his kidnapped former girlfriend Samantha "Sweet-Cheeks" Smith from the clutches of the Evil Boss on Lorgina Island.

Gameplay
The gameplay is very similar to Doom. However, instead of fighting demons, the player is set against "Dweebs" and cursed "Body Builders", other enemies included floating tiki heads and voodoo gods on a cartoon-style island setting. The player makes use of eight different weapon each using its own ammunition type. The game also utilizes various Doom assets recolored to a different palette.

Reception

PC Entertainment found the plot lame, the gameplay decent and the graphics acceptable.

References

External links
Official website

First-person shooters
DOS games
DOS-only games
1996 video games
Video games with 2.5D graphics
Video games developed in the United States
Video games set on islands
Sprite-based first-person shooters